In God We Trust, Inc. is an EP by hardcore punk band Dead Kennedys and the first of the group's releases with drummer D.H. Peligro. The record is a screed against things ranging from organized religion and Neo-Nazis, to the pesticide Kepone and government indifference that worsened the effects of Minamata disease catastrophes. In God We Trust, Inc. is also the first Dead Kennedys album released after the presidential election of Ronald Reagan and features the band's first references to Reagan, for which they—and hardcore punk as a genre—would become notorious.

Background
During 1980 and 1981 the American punk scene saw an influx of 7-inch EPs from Washington D.C.'s Dischord Records from bands like Minor Threat and Teen Idles. These little high-tempo records packed in as many as 10 songs each and helped define the 1980s genre of hardcore punk.

In wanting to pay tribute to this faster form of punk rock, and to showcase the talents of their new drummer D.H. Peligro, Dead Kennedys put together some new material and sped up a few songs that had only been heard on their 1978 demo and in early live shows. These songs became the basis for In God We Trust, Inc. Keeping with the rough-hewn style of D.C. hardcore, bits of tape leads announcing the take number and including drumstick clicks and count-offs precede many of the record's songs.

Songs

Much of the material on the EP was left over from earlier in the Dead Kennedys' career. Second guitarist 6025, who'd left the band in 1979, wrote the lead track, "Religious Vomit". The song "Kepone Factory" is a reworking of "Kepone Kids", which appeared on the group's 1978 demo tape. Alternate versions of "Moral Majority" and "Nazi Punks Fuck Off" were on a single packaged with an anti-fascist armband. "We've Got a Bigger Problem Now" is a rewritten version of the band's early single "California über alles". Originally a dig at California governor Jerry Brown, the band reworked the song to be about newly elected president Ronald Reagan and added an element of lounge music in contrast with the fast-tempo hardcore punk music on the rest of the record. The EP closes with a cover of the theme from the 1960s TV show Rawhide.

Recording
Dead Kennedys entered tiny Subterranean Studios to record eight songs on June 19, 1981. All tracks were recorded live without overdubs to ½" 8-track reel and with the band determining some of the songs' arrangements between takes.

The session was videotaped by Joe Rees of Target Video with Mike Fox, the session engineer, sending the rough mix to the video feed. When the group took the tracks to be mixed, they discovered that the magnetic tape used for the recording was defective—the oxide surface of the tape began to peel during playback, thereby destroying the recordings. The band then re-recorded all eight songs on August 22 at Mobius Music, and these recordings were released on the EP.

Years later, enhanced restoration techniques allowed for five tracks to be recovered from the master tapes from the earlier Subterranean sessions. These, along with the rough video mixes of the remaining three songs, appear on the DVD The Lost Tapes.

Artwork and releases

The album cover depicts a golden Jesus crucified on a cross of dollar bills, with a background of a shiny metal material. The band released the record internationally in 1981 on their own Alternative Tentacles label, in partnership with various other independent record labels in North America, Europe, Australia and New Zealand. The original vinyl version's A-side comprised tracks 1–5, and Side B tracks 6–8.

The original cassette version compiled all 8 songs on Side A and left Side B intentionally devoid of any sound. Printed on the cassette's second side was the explanation, "Home taping is killing record industry profits!  We left this side blank so you can help."

In God We Trust, Inc. first appeared on compact disc in 1985 as bonus material added to the Dead Kennedys' 1982 LP Plastic Surgery Disasters.

Track listing

Personnel
Dead Kennedys
 Jello Biafra – lead vocals, artwork
 East Bay Ray – guitar, backing vocals on "Moral Majority", producer
 Klaus Flouride – bass, backing vocals 
 D.H. Peligro – drums
with:
 Ninotchka (Therese Soder) – backing vocals on "Moral Majority"
 Annette Olesen – backing vocals on "Moral Majority"
 HyJean – backing vocals on "Moral Majority"
 Darvon – backing vocals on "Moral Majority"
 Siobhan – backing vocals on "Moral Majority"
Production
 Norm – producer, mixer
 Oliver Dicicco – engineer
 Annette Olesen – 2nd engineer
 Winston Smith – artwork

Charts

Certifications

References

1981 debut EPs
Dead Kennedys albums
Alternative Tentacles EPs
Songs about Ronald Reagan